The October 2007 clashes in Hakkari were a series of clashes between the Kurdistan Workers' Party and the Turkish Armed Forces.

7–8 October attacks
On 7–8 October, the Kurdistan Workers' Party (PKK) killed 15 Turkish soldiers.

In one of the heaviest single losses inflicted on the Turkish Armed Forces by the PKK, a large militant force ambushed an 18-man Turkish commando unit in the Garbar Mountains of Şırnak Province on 7 October, killing 13 soldiers and wounding three.  One PKK fighter was killed.  Following the attack, the military shelled areas near the Iraq–Turkey border to prevent the militants from crossing into northern Iraq.

Some days after, the Grand National Assembly approved a measure granting Turkish troops the right to carry out an incursion into northern Iraq.

21 October attack
The PKK blew up a bridge to prevent reinforcements thirty minutes before the attack using 15 kilograms of explosives, cutting off the main route. The PKK attackers then launched an assault on a military outpost, killing 12 soldiers and wounding 16. Eight Turkish soldiers were captured by the PKK.

One of the wounded Turkish soldiers explained the attack in an interview. He said that he was part of a company of 50 soldiers who were attacked starting at 00:20 by around 150 attackers whom even had a Doçka (a Soviet heavy anti-aircraft machine gun). The attackers retreated after 03:45 when AH-1 Cobras arrived.

The Turkish Armed Forces announced that after sending reinforcements and helicopters to the area shortly afterwards as a retaliation, 32 of the PKK militants were reportedly killed in the earlier stages of the operation.

Not far from the scene of the ambush, a minibus with a wedding party hit a landmine believed planted by the PKK. Seventeen civilians (six of them children) were injured and the minibus was completely wrecked. The wounded were airlifted to the Yüksekova hospital.

Counterattacks
Artillery was fired into northern Iraq following the 21 October attacks. On early 24 October, AH-1 Cobra helicopters and F-16 Fighting Falcon jets took off of the Diyarbakır Air base and hit PKK camps as far as 50 km into Iraqi territory. Foreign media services have confirmed this.

Turkish elite commandos began a hot pursuit operation in northern Iraq to find the eight missing Turkish soldiers. Radio chatter among PKK operatives on an open channel claimed that after their photos were taken two of the eight soldiers were taken to Arbil. The soldiers were eventually released on 4 November, though all eight were charged with "disobeying orders" by surrendering.

In the search and destroy operation in the vicinity of the attack area, Turkey captured 3 AK-47 assault rifles, 36 hand grenades, one RPG-7 rocket launcher, 27 rockets, 153 AK-47 cartridges, 10 AK-47 magazines and 500 grams of C-4 explosives from the area.

On 28 October, 8,000 Turkish troops with air support carried out a major operation in Tunceli Province, killing 20 PKK members according to the army.

Reaction
: The Press Secretary of the Foreign Ministry of Azerbaijan Khazar Ibrahim said "PKK is a terrorist organization and Azerbaijan, as a country suffering from the terrorism, understands and supports the actions of Turkey" in a press conference. Attacks by the PKK led to unorganized protests on 21 October 2007 in Baku, Azerbaijan in response.

: An anti-PKK protest had broken out in Schaerbeek Saint-Josse Belgium. Some 800 protesters have clashed with the police.  100 people were wounded. Some of the protesters rammed into a squad car wounding the 3 police officers inside. 3 people were arrested for attempted murder as a result.

: Minister of Foreign Affairs Maxime Bernier made the statement "Canada condemns the terrorist attacks inflicted upon Turkey by the Kurdistan Workers Party (PKK)."

: Minister of Foreign Affairs Bernard Kouchner made the statement: "we condemn in the strongest terms the attack by the PKK on October 21 which killed 12 Turkish soldiers. [...] For France and the European Union, the PKK is a terrorist organization which must be determinedly fought everywhere."

: Foreign Office minister Frank-Walter Steinmeier stated that "the federal government condemns any kind of terror in the strongest terms." President of Germany Turkish Society Kenan Kolat declared that "the attacks cannot have any right cause. But to state for our European friends, when it comes to Islamic terror you ask us to oppose but I think our European friends does not have the same sensitivity against terror with us."

: Minister for Foreign Affairs made the statement: "We encouraged the Turkish government in its diplomatic effort once more, condemning every terrorist action that takes place on its territory, something which is a constant Greek position"

: In preparations to a possible incursion by Turkey into northern Iraq, Iraqi Kurdistan authorities have deployed more Peshmerga fighters to the border. Talabani and Barzani stated that the PKK must leave Iraq if it desires to fight. They further stated that they would not hand a cat let alone a Kurd to the Turkish authorities and that they would not side with anyone. On a separate announcement Barzani said they do not consider the PKK to be a terrorist organization. Iraqi president Talabani said that the PKK will drop arms. After a phone call from Condoleezza Rice, Barzani also asked the PKK to cease fire. Despite this the PKK announced that a cease-fire was not the case. Iraqi prime minister Nouri al-Maliki said that all offices of PKK would be shut and that PKK will be denied the use of Iraqi soil for their operations. Maliki on a discussion with Turkish foreign relations minister Babacan has stated that the PKK is a threat to Iraq as well for  attacking the Iraqi oil pipelines, a very important source of income in Iraq.

: President of the Council of Ministers of Italy (Prime Minister) Romano Prodi in a phone call relayed his condolences and solidarity for the act of terrorism on 26 October.

: Ministry of Foreign Affairs made the statement: "The Government of Japan is concerned over the recent security situation in the Republic of Turkey where a number of people including civilians have been victimized by the terrorist attacks of the Kurdistan Workers’ Party (PKK). Terrorism cannot be justified for any reason. The Government of Japan emphatically condemns the latest series of violence by the PKK. The Government of Japan calls upon the Government of Iraq to take appropriate measures to stop the terrorist activities of PKK members hiding in northern Iraq, and the Government of Turkey to exercise utmost self-restraint. Japan hopes that the situation will swiftly calm down with the cooperation of the countries concerned."

: Attacks by the PKK has led to a series of unorganized protests that had taken place on 21 October 2007 in various cities throughout Turkey in response. In Istanbul the protests centered around Taksim Square, where political activists gave away small Turkish flags to the people congregating there. All scheduled concerts and entertainment programs were canceled in reaction to the attacks. Various Turkish business persons have condemned the attacks. 350 being women a total of 4,500 signed up as volunteers to join the armed forces to fight against the PKK. 1,200 of the 4,500 had already completed heir mandatory military service. The Turkish government is currently debating how to respond to the attacks. Turkey may cut the electricity she is selling to northern Iraq whether or not this will be cut hasn't been decided on yet. Turkish military presence at the Iraqi border has reached "highest levels" with numerous reinforcements of Tanks and other military hardware. Turkey demanded that Turkey may decide not to perform a land based operation in Northern Iraq by the Neighboring Countries of Iraq meeting on 2 November on the conditions that Iraq start returning the PKK leaders on a 150-person list already handed to Iraq and that the envoy that will come to Turkey tomorrow (25 October) to have useful intelligence information with them.

: In a press conference with the Turkish Prime Minister Erdogan, Prime Minister of the United Kingdom Gordon Brown said that they "absolutely and unequivocally condemn the terrorist violence of the PKK" and further added that they are signing a strategic partnership with Turkey.

: Head of foreign affairs Secretary of State Condoleezza Rice asked Turkey to give them a few days to respond to the attacks properly. The Turkish prime minister said that Rice was implying that the US may act together with Turkey. US president George W. Bush called the Turkish president Abdullah Gül and assured that they are with Turkey on the war against the PKK. He also added that he will continue to pressure Iraqis to take action against the PKK. David M. Satterfield, senior adviser on Iraq to United States Secretary of State Condoleezza Rice, has said that they are not pleased with the lack of action by the Kurdish leaders.

 & : In a joint statement US Secretary of State Condoleezza Rice and UK Foreign Secretary David Miliband announced that they "condemn the latest attacks by the PKK terrorist group against Turkey and its citizens." In the statement they further urged the "Iraqi and Kurdish Regional Government authorities to take immediate steps to halt PKK operations from Iraqi territory."

: Secretary General of NATO Jaap de Hoop Scheffer "firmly condemned" the latest PKK attack on behalf of the NATO Allies.

: President of the European Parliament Hans-Gert Pöttering has stated a "total condemnation of the terrorist violence perpetrated by the PKK in Turkish territory, in particular the attacks carried out over this last weekend". The statement further urged that "the International Community, in particular all the main stakeholders in the region, must support Turkey's efforts to protect its population and fight terrorism" President of the European Commission José Manuel Barroso said that Turkey has a right to defend herself. He further added that they condemned PKK's attack.

References

Hakkari
2007 in Iraqi Kurdistan
2007 in Turkey
Kurdistan Workers' Party attacks
History of Hakkâri Province
Kurdish–Turkish conflict
History of Şırnak
Hakkari